In medicine, therapeutic irrigation or lavage (  or  ) is cleaning or rinsing.

Types
Specific types include:
 Antiseptic lavage
 Bronchoalveolar lavage
 Gastric lavage
 Peritoneal lavage
 Arthroscopic lavage
 Ductal lavage
 Nasal irrigation
 Ear lavage
Pulsed lavage is delivering an irrigant (usually normal saline) under direct pressure that is produced by an electrically powered device, and is useful in cleaning e.g. chronic wounds.

See also
 Vaginal douche
 Enema

References

Medical treatments